Sostegno is a comune (municipality) in the Province of Biella in the Italian region Piedmont, located about  northeast of Turin and about  northeast of Biella.

Sostegno borders the following municipalities: Crevacuore, Curino, Lozzolo, Roasio, Serravalle Sesia, Villa del Bosco. Economy is based on the production of apples and wine.

References

Cities and towns in Piedmont